"The Truth" is a song by Norwegian DJ Kygo and American singer Valerie Broussard. It was released through Sony Music on 22 May 2020 as the sixth single from Kygo's third studio album Golden Hour. The song was written by Kyrre Gørvell-Dahll, Lena Leon and Broussard.

Personnel
Credits adapted from Tidal.
 Kyrre Gørvell-Dahll – producer, composer, lyricist, associated performer
 Lena Leon – composer, lyricist, vocal producer
 Valerie Broussard – composer, lyricist, associated performer, vocal engineer
 Myles Shear – executive producer
 Randy Merrill – mastering engineer
 Serban Ghenea – mixing engineer

Charts

Weekly charts

Year-end charts

Release history

References

2020 singles
2020 songs
Kygo songs
Song recordings produced by Kygo
Songs written by Kygo
Songs written by Valerie Broussard
Valerie Broussard songs